Forrest Township is located in Livingston County, Illinois. As of the 2010 census, its population was 1,605 and it contained 627 housing units. Forrest Township formed from a portion of Chatsworth Township as Forrestville Township in 1861, but then changed its name to just Forrest in 1865.

Geography

Demographics

References

External links
US Census
City-data.com
Illinois State Archives

Townships in Livingston County, Illinois
Populated places established in 1861
Townships in Illinois
1861 establishments in Illinois